Leela Roy Ghosh ( – 11 May 2012) was an Indian actress and voice-dubbing artist. She dubbed in Hindi, Bengali, English, Marathi and Urdu languages. She was also a dubbing director. Her daughter, Mona Ghosh Shetty, is a voice actress and singer.

Career
Ghosh was perhaps best known for being the founder and president of the dubbing studio Sound & Vision India, which is located in Andheri, Mumbai City. Her daughter Mona helped her out and they did businesses together for the company from the early 1990s until Leela's death. The company handles Indian voice-dubs (mostly Hindi) for movies that are made by Hollywood production houses such as Paramount Pictures, Universal Studios and Sony Pictures Entertainment. As of 2013, the dubbing studio has dubbed over more than 300 foreign films and over a thousand foreign TV programs.

Death
On 11 May 2012 Ghosh died from complications of liver transplant surgery at the age of 64.

Production staff

Dubbed content

Live action films

References

External links 
 
 

1940s births
2012 deaths
Indian voice actresses
21st-century Indian film directors
Indian voice directors
Film directors from Mumbai
Indian women film directors
20th-century Indian actresses
Actresses in Hindi cinema
Actresses from Mumbai
21st-century Indian actresses
20th-century Indian singers
21st-century Indian singers
Indian women playback singers
Bollywood playback singers
Singers from Mumbai
20th-century Indian women singers
21st-century Indian women singers
Women musicians from Maharashtra
Year of birth missing
Place of birth missing